The Priest's Wife is a 1970 Italian-French comedy film directed by Dino Risi. The song "Anyone", sung by Loren, was released as a single.

Cast
 Sophia Loren as Valeria Billi
 Marcello Mastroianni as Don Mario Carlesi
 Venantino Venantini as Maurizio
 Gino Cavalieri as Don Filippo
 Giuseppe Maffioli as Davide Librette
 Pippo Starnazza as Valeria's Father
 Miranda Campa as Valeria's Mother
 Dana Ghia as Lucia

References

External links

1970 films
1970 comedy films
1970s Italian-language films
Commedia all'italiana
Films about clerical celibacy
Films directed by Dino Risi
Films produced by Carlo Ponti
Films with screenplays by Ruggero Maccari
Films scored by Armando Trovajoli
Films critical of the Catholic Church
Warner Bros. films
1970s Italian films